Josh Wilkins (born June 11, 1997) is an American professional ice hockey center for the South Carolina Stingrays of the ECHL. He was an All-American for Providence.

Playing career
Wilkins began his college career in 2016 with Providence. Straight away he began providing a good deal of scoring, finishing third on the team as a freshman. He held steady in his sophomore season but improved his performance in the postseason, scoring two game-winning goals in the Friars run to the Hockey East championship game. As a junior, Wilkins became one of the top scorers in the nation, finishing in the top 10. Wilkins then helped Providence reach the Frozen Four by scoring 4 goals in three postseason games.

After his third season, Wilkins signed a two-year entry level contract with the Nashville Predators. Wilkins had a hard time finding his scoring touch as a professional, netting just 3 goals in his first full season. Due to the COVID-19 pandemic he was limited to just 30 games the following season. Though his performance did improve slightly, it wasn't enough to earn him an extension and he headed to Sweden in 2021.

Following two seasons in the Swedish HockeyAllsvenskan, Wilkins returned to North America for the 2022–23 season, signing a contract with the South Carolina Stingrays of the ECHL on June 21, 2022.

Career statistics

Regular season and playoffs

Awards and honors

References

External links

1997 births
Living people
American men's ice hockey centers
Ice hockey people from North Carolina
Sportspeople from Raleigh, North Carolina
AHCA Division I men's ice hockey All-Americans
Florida Everblades players
Milwaukee Admirals players
Providence Friars men's ice hockey players
Sioux City Musketeers players
South Carolina Stingrays players
Tucson Roadrunners players
Västerviks IK players
HC Vita Hästen players